The Yellow Line (Portuguese: Linha Amarela) is an expressway linking Cidade Universitária and Jacarepaguá in Rio de Janeiro, Brazil. The road is officially known as Avenida Governador Carlos Lacerda.

Junctions
The entire route is within the city of Rio de Janeiro.
{| class="plainrowheaders wikitable"
|-
!scope=col|Neighbourhood
!scope=col|Exit
!scope=col|Destinations
!scope=col|Notes
|-
|rowspan="2"| Jacarepaguá|||| - Barra da Tijuca, Jacarepaguá||Continues as  towards 
|-
| bgcolor="#ffdddd"|1|| bgcolor="#ffdddd"|Av. Geremário Dantas - Jacarepaguá, Freguesia, Pechincha, Tanque, Anil, Praça Seca, Grajaú|| bgcolor="#ffdddd"|Eastbound only
|-
|rowspan="2"|Freguesia|| bgcolor="#ffdddd"|1a|| bgcolor="#ffdddd"|Estr. do Pau Ferro - Freguesia, Pechincha, Tanque, Praça Seca, Grajaú|| bgcolor="#ffdddd"|Westbound only
|-
|bgcolor="#ffdddd"|1b|| bgcolor="#ffdddd"|Av. Geremário Dantas - Freguesia|| bgcolor="#ffdddd"|Westbound only
|-
| Méier||2||Eastbound: Méier, Engenho de Dentro, Água Santa, Maracanã, EncantadoWestbound: Méier, Água Santa, Cascadura, Tijuca, Encantado||
|-
| Engenho de Dentro||3||Eastbound: Engenho de Dentro, Méier, Madureira, Maracanã, Engenho Novo, Encantado, AboliçãoWestbound: Rua Guilhermina - Engenho de Dentro, Rua Goiás, 24ª Delegacia de Polícia, Encantado, Piedade, Madureira||
|-
|rowspan="3"|Del Castilho||4||Eastbound: Av. Dom Hélder Câmara - Del Castilho, Pilares, Centro, Cachambi, Abolição, Norte ShoppingWestbound: Av. Dom Hélder Câmara - Del Castilho, Hospital Salgado Filho, Pilares, Cachambi, Méier, Norte Shopping||
|-
| bgcolor="#ffdddd"|4a|| bgcolor="#ffdddd"|Del Castilho|| bgcolor="#ffdddd"|Eastbound only
|-
|5||Eastbound:   - Del Castilho, Maria da Graça, Vicente de Carvalho, IrajáWestbound:   - Del Castilho, Cemitério de Inhaúma, Maria da Graça, Largo do Bicão, Vicente de Carvalho||
|-
| Maria da Graça||6||Eastbound:  Estr. Ademar Bebiano - Maria da Graça, Del Castilho, Inhaúma, Higienópolis, BonsucessoWestbound:  Estr. Ademar Bebiano - Maria da Graça||
|-
|rowspan="2"|Bonsucesso||7||Eastbound: Av. dos Democráticos - Bonsucesso, Higienópolis, Ramos, Penha, São CristóvãoWestbound: Av. dos Democráticos - Bonsucesso||
|-
|8||Eastbound: Av. Leopoldo Bulhões - Bonsucesso, Praça das Nações, Olaria, BenficaWestbound: Av. Leopoldo Bulhões - Bonsucesso, Praça das Nações, Penha, Manguinhos, Benfica||
|-
| Manguinhos|| bgcolor="#ffdddd"|9a|| bgcolor="#ffdddd"| Av. Brasil (towards Centro) - Benfica, São Cristóvão, Caju, Centro, South Zone|| bgcolor="#ffdddd"|Eastbound only
|-
|rowspan="2"|Maré|| bgcolor="#ffdddd"|9b|| bgcolor="#ffdddd"| Av. Brasil (towards West Zone) - Campo Grande, Baixada Fluminense, BR-040;|| bgcolor="#ffdddd"|Eastbound only
|-
| bgcolor="#ffdddd"|9c|| bgcolor="#ffdddd"| Av. Brasil (towards West Zone) - Penha, São Paulo|| bgcolor="#ffdddd"|Westbound only
|-
| Bonsucesso|| bgcolor="#ffdddd"|9d|| bgcolor="#ffdddd"| Av. Brasil (towards Centro) - Benfica, São Cristóvão, Caju, Centro, South Zone|| bgcolor="#ffdddd"|Westbound only
|-
| Maré|| bgcolor="#ffdddd"|10a|| bgcolor="#ffdddd"| Red Line (towards Centro) - Santos Dumont Airport, South Zone, São Cristóvão, Rio–Niterói Bridge, || bgcolor="#ffdddd"|Eastbound only
|-
| Cidade Universitária|| bgcolor="#ffdddd"|10b|| bgcolor="#ffdddd"| Red Line (towards Baixada Fluminense) - Rio de Janeiro–Galeão International Airport, Ilha do Governador, São Paulo|| bgcolor="#ffdddd"|Eastbound only
|-

References

Transport in Rio de Janeiro (city)